Georgia competed at the 2014 Summer Youth Olympics, in Nanjing, China from 16 August to 28 August 2014.

Medalists

Athletics

Georgia qualified four athletes.

Qualification Legend: Q=Final A (medal); qB=Final B (non-medal); qC=Final C (non-medal); qD=Final D (non-medal); qE=Final E (non-medal)

Boys
Field Events

Girls
Field events

Boxing

Georgia qualified one boxer based on its performance at the 2014 AIBA Youth World Championships

Boys

Fencing

Georgia qualified one athlete based on its performance at the 2014 FIE Cadet World Championships.

Boys

Mixed Team

Gymnastics

Trampoline

Georgia qualified one athlete based on its performance at the 2014 European Trampoline Championships.

Judo

Georgia qualified two athletes based on its performance at the 2013 Cadet World Judo Championships.

Individual

Team

Swimming

Georgia qualified one swimmer.

Boys

Wrestling

Georgia qualified two athletes based on its performance at the 2014 European Cadet Championships.

Boys

References

2014 in Georgian sport
Nations at the 2014 Summer Youth Olympics
Georgia (country) at the Youth Olympics